House at 216 Warren Street was a historic home located at Glens Falls, Warren County, New York.  It was built in 1874 and was an asymmetrical, two-story eclectic frame residence in the Second Empire style.  It features a mansard roof and two-story corner tower.

It was added to the National Register of Historic Places in 1984.

The house was demolished sometime between June 2012 and October 2014 (based on Google Street Views).

References

Houses on the National Register of Historic Places in New York (state)
Second Empire architecture in New York (state)
Houses completed in 1874
Houses in Warren County, New York
National Register of Historic Places in Warren County, New York